Eurochambres is the Association of European Chambers of Commerce and Industry. The association is one of the largest business representative organisations in Brussels, representing over 20 million businesses in Europe through 45 members (43 national associations of chambers of commerce and industry and 2 transnational chamber organisations) and a European network of 1,700 regional and local chambers. More than 93% of these businesses are small and medium sized enterprises. Chambers’ member businesses employ over 120 million.

Eurochambres' direct members are national associations of chambers of commerce based in 25 European Union countries, European Free Trade Association countries, and some Eastern European, Western Balkans and Mediterranean countries.

Eurochambres’ vision is an integrated, globally competitive Europe, where businesses can prosper and drive socio-economic progress. Chambers have an active role to play in the pursuit of this vision. Reflecting this, Eurochambres strives to represent Chambers of Commerce and Industry and their member companies towards the EU institutions, to identify relevant joint activities and capacity building across the European chamber network.

History
Eurochambres was founded 28 February 1958 as the "Conférence Permanente des Chambres de Commerce et d’Industrie de la CEE" by six members with the mission to promote the views of Chamber organisations on the unification of national legislation at the European level and to form opinions regarding the modifications to be made to commercial legislation. An important objective of the Conférence was also to bring closer competences in order to provide an example of the European cooperation of the highest quality level. The Conférence Permanente held its first assembly in Strasbourg on 28 February 1958. Initial members were national association of Chambers of Commerce and Industry from Belgium, France, Germany, Italy, Luxembourg and Netherlands. The year 1961 saw the creation of the first technical committees and 4 new members joined. A permanent Secretariat was created in 1977 (before the various countries assumed the role in turns).

Eurochambres, the Association of European Chambers of Commerce and Industry was registered as an international non-profit organisation in Belgium (AISBL - Association internationale à but non lucratif) in 1977. The network expanded progressively to 43 national associations plus 2 transnational organisations of Chambers from an enlarged Europe.

One of Eurochambres’ most prominent activities is the European Parliament of Enterprises, which is organised in coordination with the European Parliament. The first edition took place in 2008 and gathered some 774 European businesses of all sizes and from all sectors in the European Parliament hemicycle in Brussels. Further editions of the event were also organised in 2010, 2012, 2014, 2016 and 2018.

Current leadership

Information from official website.

 Luc Frieden (Finance minister of the Grand Duchy of Luxembourg and current president of the Luxembourg Chamber of Commerce) 
 Vladimir Dlouhy (President of the Chamber of Commerce and Industry of Czech Republic) - Deputy President
 Ian Talbot (CEO of Chambers Ireland) - Deputy President
 Stephan Müchler (President of the Chamber of Czech Republic) - Deputy President
 Marta Schultz (Vice President, Austrian Federal Economic Chamber) - Vice President
Alain Di Crescenzo (President of CCI France) - Vice President
 Wolfgang Grenke (Member of the Board of the Association of German Chambers of Industry and Commerce – DIHK) - Vice President
Michl Ebner (President of the Chamber of Commerce, Industry, Crafts and Agriculture of Bolzano, Italy) - Vice President
Marek Kloczko (Vice President and Director General of the Polish Chamber of Commerce) - Vice President
 Jose Luis Bonet Ferrer (President of Spanish Chamber of Commerce) - Vice President
 Ben Butters - CEO

Members
Currently Eurochambres has 45 members, 43 of them being national chambers and 2 transnational chambers:

Its General Secretariat office is based in Brussels, Belgium.

See also 
 Business association
 British Chambers of Commerce
 Lobbying
 Non-governmental organization
 Trade group
 Trade union
 United States Chamber of Commerce

External links

Non-profit organisations based in Belgium
Cross-European advocacy groups
Pan-European trade and professional organizations